The Maiden Stack or Frau Stack is a tiny stack in the western Shetland Islands to the north of Brei Holm and east of Housa Voe in Papa Stour.

It is so called because of the tiny house at its top. It is said to have been built in the 14th century by Lord Þorvald Þoresson, in order to "preserve" his daughter from men. Unfortunately, when she left, she was found to be pregnant, and probably no longer a virgin.

There are various versions of the story. Another is recorded by Hibbert:

One of these insulated rocks, named Frau-a-stack or the Lady’s Stack - accessible to none but the best of climbers - is crowned on the summit by the remains of a small building, that was originally built by a Norwegian Lady, to preserve herself from the solicitations of suitors, when she had entered into a vow of pure celibacy. The ascent to the house was considered almost unsurmountable, except by the help of ropes. But a dauntless lover, an udaller from Islesburgh, contrived in the dark secrecy of evening to scale the stack, and, after the first surprise was overcome, so far ingratiated himself in the fair devotee’s affections that, in a fatal hour she was induced:

To trust the opportunity of night
And the ill counsel of a desert place
With the rich worth of her virginity.When the consequence of the Lady’s faux pas could no longer be concealed, Frau-a-stack became the scoff of the island, and was deserted by its fair and frail tenant. The house was soon afterwards unroofed and reduced to ruin, in contempt of the vow of chastity that had been broken’'' 

In a third version of the story, the lady was incarcerated by her father because of her interest in a common fisherman. Eventually she and her sweetheart successfully eloped.

References

Stacks of Scotland
Uninhabited islands of Shetland